Sir Cecil William Hunter-Rodwell   (29 December 1874 – 23 February 1953) was a British colonial administrator who served as Governor of Southern Rhodesia, British Guiana, and Fiji.

Biography
Born in England, Rodwell attended Cheam School and Eton College and went up to Cambridge in 1892 to study at King's College. Upon the outbreak of the South African War, Rodwell joined the Suffolk Yeomanry and was awarded the Queen's Medal with two clasps for bravery.

Rodwell remained in South Africa after the war, working on the staff of Lord Milner, the British High Commissioner in South Africa, from 1901 to 1903 and as Imperial Secretary for the High Commission from 1903 to 1918, during which time he was made a CMG.

In 1918 Rodwell was appointed Governor of Fiji and High Commissioner for the Western Pacific, positions he held until 1924 when he was appointed Governor of British Guiana. During his term the Legislative Council of British Guiana was established and Rodwell did much to develop the economic resources of the colony.

In 1928 Rodwell was appointed Governor of Southern Rhodesia, where he left a controversial legacy. Remembered fondly by the white settlers (in one case he was referred to as a "top-hole person"), Rodwell's response to a plea by a Jesuit missionary for funds to build a hospital for the black community around Kutama College; "Why do you worry about a hospital? After all, there are too many natives in the country already", would have been concerning enough had it not been said in the presence of a young Robert Mugabe. Mugabe later said that he never forgot nor forgave Rodwell's response.

Rodwell returned to South Africa to work in the mining industry at the end of his term as Governor of South Rhodesia in 1934, serving on the board of directors of the oil company Ultramar. After retiring and moving to England Rodwell was appointed Controller of Industrial Diamonds in the Ministry of Supply in 1942, serving until 1945.
 
Rodwell died at his home near Ipswich, survived by his wife, three sons, and two daughters. He was appointed CMG in 1909, KCMG in 1919 and GCMG in 1934.

References

|-

1874 births
1953 deaths
Businesspeople from Ipswich
British Army personnel of the Second Boer War
Alumni of King's College, Cambridge
Governors of Fiji
Members of the Legislative Council of Fiji
Governors of British Guiana
Governors of Southern Rhodesia
Knights Grand Cross of the Order of St Michael and St George
People educated at Cheam School
People educated at Eton College
Suffolk Yeomanry officers
High Commissioners for the Western Pacific